Ivo Mihaylov (born 4 April 1989) is a Bulgarian footballer currently playing for Svetkavitsa Targovishte as a midfielder.

Career

Youth career
Ivo started his training as a youth at Spartak Varna. In 2004, he join Levski's academy.

On 2 January 2008 the left-wing of Levski Sofia Ivo Mihailov was invited by his first club Spartak Varna to join in their team again. He played on loan for Spartak Varna until the end of the 2007/2008 season.

In February 2009 Ivo was loaned for six months in Belasitsa Petrich. After the end of the 08–09 season, he returned to Levski, but he was expected to be loaned again.

FC Chavdar Etropole
On 30 June 2009, Mihailov was sold to FC Chavdar Etropole.

Return to Spartak
On 17 January 2018 he rejoined his youth club Spartak Varna.

References

External links

1989 births
Living people
Bulgarian footballers
First Professional Football League (Bulgaria) players
PFC Levski Sofia players
PFC Spartak Varna players
FC Chavdar Etropole players
PFC Kaliakra Kavarna players
PFC Svetkavitsa players
Association football midfielders
Sportspeople from Varna, Bulgaria